Jane Goldman is an English screenwriter, author and producer.

Jane Goldman may also refer to:
Jane Goldman (real estate investor)
Jane Goldman (speed skater)